Ivan Vukadinović (Belgrade, 1974) is a Serbian writer and essayist. He writes epic and science fiction novels, essays on geopolitics, science and literature, as well as travelogues on mountaineering.

Biography
Vukadinović graduated from the 6th Belgrade Gymnasium and the Faculty of Organizational Sciences in Belgrade. 

He made his debut as a novelist in 2006 with the fantasy trilogy "Three Goblins", which is a continuation of J. R. R. Tolkien's realm.

Bibliography
Eternal Fire ("Three Goblins" 1: a thousand years after The Lord of the Rings), independent author's edition, Belgrade, 2006 and. 2007.  .. i. ;
Scepter ("Three Goblins" 2), independent author's edition. Belgrade: 2007. ;
Dawn of the New Day ("Three Goblins" 3), independent author's edition. Belgrade: 2007. ;
Agartha: the kingdom of the underworld and the earth, "Liber". Belgrade: 2010. ;
Heretics Agarte, "Draslar partner". Belgrade: 2012. ;
Artifact, Scriptorium. Belgrade: 2012. ;
World of Agartha, "Pesic and Sons". Belgrade: 2014. .

Reception
In reviewing the Heretics Agartha the writer Danko Stojić says that "Vukadinović is a writer who has excellent knowledge from many scientific and parascientific fields (...) A book of knowledge feeds his imagination and drives him to various speculations (...) Heretic Agartha can be a kind of breviary for lovers of mysticism and occultism. ”

Regarding ArtefactStojić writes that Vukadinović's novels "are on the border of science fiction and historical fiction, playfully and boldly play[ed] with the phenomena of time and space, while his imagination is boundless."

References 

1974 births
Writers from Belgrade
Living people
Serbian male essayists
21st-century Serbian writers
Serbian novelists